is the 10th single of the all-girl J-pop group Berryz Kobo, released on March 29, 2006.

The single ranked 6th in the Oricon Weekly Singles Chart, setting a new high for the group.

Details 
 Main vocalist: Momoko Tsugunaga, Miyabi Natsuyaki
 Minor Vocalist: Risako Sugaya
 Center: Risako Sugaya

Track listing

CD track list 
  <br/ > (Composition and Lyrics: Tsunku, Arrangement: Yuasa Kouichi)
  <br/ > (Composition and Lyrics: Tsunku, Arrangement: Akira)

Single V

References

External links 
 Profile at the Hello! Project official site

Berryz Kobo songs
2006 singles
Song recordings produced by Tsunku
Songs written by Tsunku